Brooks is an unincorporated community in Summers County, West Virginia, United States.  It lies along the New River to the north of the city of Hinton, the county seat of Summers County.   Its elevation is 1,657 feet (505 m).

History
Brooks is named for an early settler.

References

Unincorporated communities in Summers County, West Virginia
Unincorporated communities in West Virginia